Singin' the Blues is a 1956 album by Jimmy Witherspoon. Witherspoon's session band included Harry Edison and Gerald Wilson on trumpet, Teddy Edwards and Jimmy Allen on tenor sax, Henry McDode and Hampton Hawes on piano, Herman Mitchell on rhythm guitar, Jimmy Hamilton on bass and Jimmy Miller on drums. The album was recorded for and released by Rip Records in 1956, and re-released in 1958 by World Pacific Records. The reissued album led the organizers of the 1959 Monterey Jazz Festival to include Witherspoon in the festival.

Track list
 "S.K. Blues" – Saunders King
 "When I've Been Drinkin'" – Big Bill Broonzy
 "Then the Lights Go Out" – Jimmy Witherspoon
 "All That's Good" – Al Ciminelli
 "Spoon's Blues" – Al Ciminelli
 "It Ain't What You're Thinkin'" – traditional
 "Ain't Nobody's Business" – Porter Grainger / Everett Robbins
 "Wee Baby Blues" – Pete Johnson / Big Joe Turner
 "Times Are Changing" – Teddy Edwards
 "Sweet's Blues" – Al Ciminelli
 "There's Good Rockin' Tonight" – Robert Geddins
 "Midnight Blues (Red Shirt)" – Teddy Edwards

References

1956 albums